William Chak (born 29 March 1985) is a Hong Kong actor and presenter who achieved fame through TVB's 2010 Mr. Hong Kong contest. He formerly performed under the stage name Chak Fung.

When Chak was eighteen, he traveled to Tokyo, Japan, as an exchange student and performed as a comedic dancer in the streets to earn tuition money. After winning the 1st runner up at Hong Kong ATV's 2005 Mr. Asia Contest, he returned to Japan to finish his schooling. In 2006, he signed an artiste contract with ATV. In 2008, Chak graduated from N-atv's Artiste Training Class. After his contracted with ATV ended in 2009, Chak stayed in South Korea for a year, and earned a black belt in Taekwondo. He returned to Hong Kong in 2010 and joined TVB's 2010 Mr. Hong Kong contest, and holds the record for the first Mr. Hong Kong to win eight different awards.

Filmography

Film

Television drama

Hosting programmes
2006–07：Facts (Co-host)
2007–2008: Smart Class (Co-host)
2008: HD Game King (Co-host)
2008: Sik Yum, Sik Sik, Sik Heung Mei (識飲識食識香味) (Co-host)
2010: Kitchen Diva Louisa (Guest host)
2010: Papua Solomon's Treasure (Co-host)
2011: Hap Kar Foon Lok Ying San Chun (合家歡樂迎新春) (Co-host)
2011: Bao Chui Kei Yan (爆趣奇人) (Co-host)
2011: William's Korea Adventures
2012: The Sun Rises Still (Co-host)

Awards
2005: Mr. Asia 
1st runner up
Hong Kong Male's Most SMS Popular Contestant
2010: Mr. Hong Kong

References

External links
Official TVB Blog 
Official Weibo 

|-
! colspan="3" style="background: #DAA520;" | Mr. Hong Kong
|-

Living people
1985 births
TVB actors
21st-century Hong Kong male actors
Hong Kong male taekwondo practitioners